Zefania Carmel (born December 21, 1940, in Baghdad, Iraq; died September 1980) was an Israeli yachting world champion.

Yachting career
Carmel partnered with Lydia Lazarov to win the Israeli yachting championship in 1966 in the 420-Class. They won the world championships in the Team 420 Non-Olympic Sailing Class in 1969. Carmel won the individual Israeli yachting championship in 1970.

Death
Carmel drowned during training in September 1980.

Hall of Fame
Carmel was inducted into the International Jewish Sports Hall of Fame in 1982.

See also
List of select Jews in sailing

References

1940 births
1980 deaths
Sportspeople from Baghdad
Iraqi emigrants to Israel
Israeli male sailors (sport)
Jewish sailors (sport)